The following is a timeline of the history of the metropolis of Lagos, Nigeria.

Prior to 19th century

 1472 - Ruy de Sequeira of Portugal names area "Lago de Curamo."
 1600 - Ashipa becomes Oba.
 1630
 King Ado in power.
 Iga Idunganran built (approximate date).
 1669 - King Gabaro in power.
 1704 - King Akinsemoyin in power.
 1749
 Eletu Kekere becomes Oba.
 King Ologun Kutere in power.
 1775 - Adele Ajosun becomes Oba.
 1780 - Eshilokun becomes Oba.

19th century

 1829 - Oba Idewu Ojulari in power.
 1837 - Oba Oluwole in power.
 1841 - Akitoye becomes Oba.
 1845 - Oba Kosoko in power.
 1851 - British bombardment of Lagos.
 1852 - British consulate established.
 1853 - King Dosunmu in power.
1859- The CMS Grammar School in Bariga, a suburb of Lagos in Lagos State, is the oldest secondary school in Nigeria, founded on 6 June 1859 by the Church Missionary Society
 1860 - Catholic church established.
 1861 - Lagos annexed by the British.
 1862 - Lagos becomes a British colony.
 1866 - Population: 25,083.
 1878 - Methodist Boys' High School founded.
 1881 - Population: 37,452.
 1885 - Oba Oyekan I in power.
 1886 - Telephone cables connect Lagos to London.
 1888 - Lagos Chamber of Commerce established.
 1889 - Court House built.
 1894
 Lagos Echo and Lagos Standard newspapers begin publication.
 Bank of British West Africa established.
 1898 - Electric street lighting commences operation.
 1899
 Anglo-African Bank established.
 Briton William MacGregor becomes governor of Lagos Colony.
 1900 - Ibadan-Lagos railway begins operating.

20th century

1901–1959

 1901
 Oba Eshugbayi Eleko in power.
 Carter Bridge built.
 Lagos Institute founded.
 Population: 41,487.
 1903 - Artist Aina Onabolu active.
 1908 - Lagos Municipal Board of Health and People's Union established.
 1909 - King's College, Lagos founded.
 1911
 Kano-Lagos railway begins operating.
 Anti-Slavery and Aborigines Protection Society chapter established.
 Population: 73,766.
 1913 - Apapa wharf built.
 1914
 Lagos becomes capital of the British Colony and Protectorate of Nigeria.
 Lagos Central Times newspaper begins publication (approximate date).
 Anfani Bus Service begins operating.
 1917 - Lagos Town Council and Colonial Bank established.
 1920s - Lagos Market Women's Association founded.
 1921 - Population: 98,303.
 1923
 Ansar Ud Deen (religious group) and Lagos Women's League established.
 Nigerian National Democratic Party founded in Lagos.
 1925
 Oba Ibikunle Akitoye in power.
 Lagos Daily News newspaper begins publication.
 1926
 Nigerian Daily Times newspaper begins publication.
 Industrial Army Home (reformatory) built in Yaba.
 1927 - Queen's College, Lagos and Lagos Executive Development Board established.
 1928
 Oba Sanusi Olusi in power.
 St Gregory's College, Lagos and Lagos Book Club founded.
 1930 - Stadium built.
 1931
 Tom Jones Library opens.
 Population: 126,474.
 1932
 Oba Falolu in power.
 Igbobi College and Yaba Higher College founded.
 1939 - Yaba Estate built.
 1943 - Art Exhibition Centre and Lagos Museum open.
 1944 - Nigerian Women's Party organized in Lagos.
 1945 - Holy Child College Obalende established.
 1946
 Anglican Cathedral built.
 Nigerian Breweries incorporated.
 1947 - Yaba College of Technology founded.
 1949
 "Rent control committee" organized.
 Oba Adeniji Adele in power.
 1950
 Mayoral council established; Abubakar Ibiyinka Olorun-Nimbe elected mayor.
 Roman Catholic Archdiocese of Lagos active.
 1951 - Lagos becomes part of the Western Region.
 1952 - Population: 267,407.
 1957
 Nigerian National Museum founded.
 Irohin Imole Yoruba-language newspaper begins publication.
 1958 - Stationery Stores Football Club founded.

1960–1999
 1960 - Lagos Stock Exchange and Nigeria Acceptances Limited.
 1961 - Nigerian Institute of International Affairs founded.
 1962 - University of Lagos established.
 1963
 Independence House built.
 Population: 655,246.
 1964
 National Library of Nigeria built.
 Bagatelle restaurant in business (approximate date).
 Lebanese Community School established.
 1965 - Adeyinka Oyekan II becomes Oba.
 1967
 Lagos State created.
 Mobolaji Johnson becomes governor of Lagos State.
 1972 - Lagos National Stadium built.
 1973 - 2nd All-Africa Games held.
 1975
 Eko Bridge built.
 Federal Government College Lagos and Bridge Boys Football Club founded.
 Adekunle Lawal becomes governor of Lagos State.
 Population: 1,060,848 city; 1,476,837 urban agglomeration.
 1976 - National Arts Theatre built.
 1977
 Second World African Festival of Arts and Culture held in Festac Town.
 Fela Kuti's Kalakuta Republic compound in Mushin burns down.
 Nigerian Institute of Medical Research established in Yaba (approximate date).
 Ndubuisi Kanu becomes governor of Lagos State.
 1978 - Ebitu Ukiwe becomes governor of Lagos State.
 1979
 Murtala Muhammed International Airport opens.
 Lateef Jakande becomes governor of Lagos State.
 1980
 Badagry-Lagos highway constructed.
 Lagos Plan of Action drafted.
 Apata Memorial High School founded.
 Wonder Baking Company in business.
 1981
 International School Lagos established.
 Winners' Chapel megachurch begins.
 1982 - Indian Language School established.
 1983
 Vanguard newspaper begins publication.
 Mama Cass restaurant in business.
 1984 - Gbolahan Mudasiru becomes governor of Lagos State.
 1985 - Newswatch magazine begins publication.
 1986 - Mike Akhigbe becomes governor of Lagos State.
 1988 - Raji Rasaki becomes governor of Lagos State.
 1989
 African Championships in Athletics held.
 Intercontinental Bank founded.
 1990
 Third Mainland Bridge opens.
 Lagos City Polytechnic and Equitorial Trust Bank established.
 Population: 4,764,000 (urban agglomeration).
 1991
 Federal government relocates from Lagos to Abuja.
 Tell Magazine begins publication.
 Diamond Bank opens.
 Lagos Business School established.
 1992
 Pepsi Football Academy founded, Agege.
 Nigerian Air Force C-130 crash.
 Michael Otedola becomes governor of Lagos State.
 1993
 Jhalobia Gardens opens.
 Olagunsoye Oyinlola becomes governor of Lagos State.
 1994
 Chocolat Royal in business.
 P.M. News newspaper begins publication.
 1995
 Thisday newspaper begins publication.
 Population: 5,966,000 (urban agglomeration).
 1996
 Babington Macaulay Junior Seminary established.
 Tastee Fried Chicken opens in Surulere.
 Mohammed Buba Marwa becomes governor of Lagos State.
 1997
 Redeemer's International Secondary School founded in Maryland.
 Tantalizers restaurant opens in Festac Town (approximate date).
 1999
 20 February: Nigerian parliamentary election, 1999 held.
 Bola Tinubu becomes governor of Lagos State.
 2000 - **Population: 7,233,000 (urban agglomeration).

21st century

 2001 - The Daily Independent newspaper begins publication.
 2002
 City divided "into 57 local council areas."
 Pan-African University, Lagos established.
 Lagos armoury explosion.
 2003
 Oba Rilwan Akiolu in power.
 The Sun newspaper begins publication.
 2004
 Spring Bank founded.
 Silverbird Cinema in business.
 2005
 Business Day newspaper begins publication.
 SunRise Sixth Form College established.
 Population: 8,767,000 (urban agglomeration).
 16 November: Fire at Ebute Metta.
 2006
 2006 Lagos building collapses
 The Nation newspaper begins publication.
 Tin Can Island Port Complex formed.
 FinBank founded.
 Palms Shopping Mall opens.
 May - Atlas Creek pipeline explosion.
 December - Abule Egba pipeline explosion.
 Moments with Mo talk show begins broadcasting.
 2007
 April: State election held; Babatunde Fashola becomes governor of Lagos State.
 Teslim Balogun Stadium built.
 Centre for Contemporary Art founded.
 2008
 Next newspaper begins publication.
 My People Football Club founded.
 Ijegun pipeline explosion.
 2009 - Nike Centre for Art and Culture opens.
 2010
 Lagos Photo festival begins.
 Whitespace cultural venue active.
 2011
 Lagos Fashion Week begins.
 Enterprise Bank Limited, Keystone Bank Limited, and Mainstreet Bank Limited formed.
 Ikeja City Mall, L'Espace (shop), and Google office in business.
 2012
 Makoko slum razed.
 Lagos Countdown begins.
 2013
 Lekki-Ikoyi Link Bridge opens.
 Makoko Floating School built.
 Eko Atlantic development construction begins.
 2014
 Ebola virus outbreak.
 12 September: Synagogue Church building collapse occurs in nearby Ikotun-Egbe.
 2015 – 12 August: Helicopter crash in Oworonshoki.
 2016 - Building collapse.
 2018 - African Championships in Athletics.
 2019 - School collapse.
 2020 - End SARS protests.
 2021 - High-rise collapse.

See also

 History of Lagos
 List of Governors of Lagos State
 List of Lagos State local government areas by population
 Timelines of other cities in Nigeria: Ibadan, Kano, Port Harcourt

References

Bibliography

Published in 19th-20th centuries
 
 
  (children's book)

Published in 21st century

2000s
  + website

2010s
 
  
 
 
 
 
 
 
 
 
 
 
 
 
  (photos)

External links

 Map of Lagos, 1962
 Map of Lagos, 1984
  (Bibliography of open access  articles)
 
 
 

Lagos
History of Lagos
Lagos
Lagos-related lists
lagos